The Yalong Bay Forest Park Glass Bridge is a glass bridge overlooking Yalong Bay, in Sanya, Hainan, China. It is located in the Yalong Bay Tropical Paradise Forest Park, is 400-meters-long, and is a tourist attraction.

It is the first glass bridge in Hainan and is made of tempered glass 30mm thick. The bridge can support loads of up to 1000 kg per sq. m. The highest point above the ground below is 100 metres.

References

External links

Bridges in Hainan
Tourist attractions in Sanya
Bridges completed in 2018